"Slide Along Side" is a song recorded by Shifty Shellshock. It was released in June 2004 as the lead single from his debut album Happy Love Sick.

Track listing

Charts

References

2004 singles
2004 songs
Song recordings produced by the Neptunes